The J.H. Cerilles State College or JHCSC formerly known as Josefina H. Cerilles Polytechnic College, is a public college in the Philippines. Its main campus is located in Mati, San Miguel, Zamboanga del Sur.

On February 20, 1995, Republic Act No. 7895 was signed into law converting the then Josefine H. Cerilles National High School into a college to become Josefina H. Cerilles Polytechnic College. By virtue of R.A. 9159 authored by Cong. Aurora Cerilles, the college was converted into J.H. Cerilles State College. This state college is the smallest yet fastest growing state college in its first three years of operation. The local political climate has a constant impact on its operation and development.

The name 
The school was named Josefina H. Cerilles Memorial Barangay High School in honor of the assemblyman's beloved wife who was once a supervisor of DECS. This was approved through a Sangguniang Bayan Resolution No. 23 in April 1983 and Sangguniang Panlalawigan Resolution No. 295-A in 1984 pursuant to DECS Order N0.6, series of 1983.

Crispin Mag-usara took the leadership of the newly created school and not long after, Fortunato Gumintad succeeded him as teacher-in-charge. With the cooperation of the school's faculty and staff, and the residents of the community, Gumintad made a lot of improvements of the school which was originally constructed out of light materials.

In 1987, when all barangay high schools in the country were fully nationalized, the school's name was changed to Josefina H. Cerilles National High School. In the succeeding year, it was one of the lucky recipients of the Secondary Education Development Program (SEDP) building package and subsequently thereafter, the U.S. AID academic building package.

From JHCPC to J.H. Cerilles State College 
On February 25, 1995, Josefina H. Cerilles National High School was converted into Josefina H. Cerilles Polytechnic College by virtue of the Republic Act 7895 authored by Congressman Antonio H. Cerilles. With this development, the High School Department became the laboratory school of the Teacher Education Department of the college.

In 1996, Josefina H. Cerilles Polytechnic College started its full operation as a CHED-Supervised Institution with Mr. Francisco Caylan of the DECS as its Officer-In- Charge. The first eight faculty members of the college were Mrs. Filomena G. Montealto, Mrs. Winifreda L. Rico, Mrs. Daylinda P. Sulong, Mrs. Mila A. Samin, Miss Nelia B. Aragon, Engr. Jerry B. Superales, Mr. Lumabao B. Sanlao and Mr. Jesus B. Purisima.

In 1997, Mrs. Filomena G. Montealto was appointed as Vocational School Superintendent and since then, she took the lead in all the educational ventures of the college while at the same time upholding its vision, mission and goals by providing quality and relevant education to all its students.

After six years of operation as a CHED-Supervised Institution, JHCPC was converted into J.H. Cerilles State College on August 11, 2001, by virtue of the Republic Act 9159 authored by Congresswoman Aurora E. Cerilles. Montealto was appointed as the First President of the State College.

Integration 
In June 2006, two External Units were opened in the municipalities of Josefina and San Pablo. A former WMSU-ESU in the municipality of Margosatubig was affiliated to JHCSC in June of this year. CMSECAT (Canuto MS Enerio College of Arts and Trade) in the municipality of Lakewood was integrated to the college in October of the same year.

On December 1, 2006, Dr. Carlicita A. Saniel was appointed by the JHCSC-BOT as president of the college to serve the remaining term of Montealto while Dante B. Bayocot assumed his former position as College Registrar.

In March 2007, Saniel was installed by JHCSC-BOT as the second president of the college. During her term of office, new External Units were opened to cater the educational needs of the poor but deserving students of Zamboanga del Sur. These External Units are located in the municipalities of Vincenzo Sagun (opened in June 2007), Tabina (October 2007), Guipos (June 2009) and Sominot (June 2009). The integration of ZSAC (Zamboanga del Sur Agricultural College) to JHCSC in June 2009 led to the birth of JHCSC-Dumingag Campus. This was followed by the offering of extension classes of JHCSC-Main in Dumalinao (June 2012) and the extension classes of JHCSC-Dumingag in Molave and Aurora.

On June 15, 2012, JHCSC-BOT confirmed Saniel as president of JHCSC for the second term. Today, the JHCSC System has 3 Organic Campuses and 18 External Units located in the different municipalities of Zamboanga del Sur. Its main campus is preparing for its Level 1 accreditation with AACCUP.

In order to make education accessible to the poorest of the poor in the province of Zamboanga del Sur, JHCSC External Units were opened in the municipalities of Tigbao, Lapuyan, Dimataling, Mahayag, Tambulig, and Ramon Magsaysay in June 2005. Three former Western Mindanao State University-External Studies Units’ (WMSU-ESU) were affiliated to JHCSC during this year. It was also the year which marked the opening of JHCSC-Pagadian Annex.

References

Local colleges and universities in the Philippines
Universities and colleges in Zamboanga del Sur